C. giganteum may refer to:
 Campanile giganteum, a species of exceptionally large fossil sea snail
 Cardiocrinum giganteum, the giant Himalayan lily, the largest species of any of the lily plants found in the Himalayan

See also
 Giganteum